Love's Blindness is a 1926 silent film directed by John Francis Dillon. The film stars Pauline Starke, Antonio Moreno, and Lilyan Tashman. Written by Elinor Glyn, the film was produced under the direct supervision of the author. The film is considered lost with just a fragment surviving at the BFI National Film & TV Archive in London.

Plot
In Britain, Hubert Culverdale (Antonio Moreno) is the hard-up and hard-to-please milord who marries luscious Vanessa Levy (Pauline Starke) for financial reasons only.

Cast
 Pauline Starke - Vanessa Levy
 Antonio Moreno - Hubert Culverdale, 8th Earl of St. Austel
 Lilyan Tashman - Alice, Duchess of Lincolnwood
 Sam De Grasse - Benjamin Levy
 Douglas Gilmore - Charles Langley
 Kate Price - Marchioness of Hurlshire
 Tom Ricketts - Marquis of Hurlshire
 Earl Metcalfe - Col. Ralph Dangerfield
 George Waggner - Oscar Issacson
 Rose Dione - Mme. De Jainon
 Ned Sparks - Valet

References

External links

allmovie/synopsis: Love's Blindness

Lost American films
Metro-Goldwyn-Mayer films
American silent feature films
American black-and-white films
1926 drama films
1926 films
Silent American drama films
Films set in London
1920s English-language films
1926 lost films
Lost drama films
Films directed by John Francis Dillon
1920s American films